Ryegaard is a manor house and estate in Lejre Municipality, Denmark. Ryegaard and neighbouring Trudsholm is owned by the Rosenkrantz/Skeel families since the year 1735. The two estates add up to a combined area of 1,228 hectares.

History
Ryegaard is first mentioned in 1350when Folmer Folmersen acquired it from the Crown in exchange for other property. The next owner was Jakob Olufsen Lunge and the estate then remained in the hands of the Lunge family until Sophie Folmersdatter Lunge, by marriage, transferred it to Claus Serlin. After his death, Ryegaard passed to Otte Alretsen Selin and then to his daughter Sophie Clausdatter Serlin. She married David Arildsen in 1452. Having no children, they bequeathed Ryegård  to a grandson of Serlin, Niels Clausen, who was Bishop of Aarhus. The next owner was Erik Eriksen Banner. His son, Frantz Banner, inherited the estate in 1554. He began the constructed of a new main building after the old one was destroyed by fire in 1569. He also increased the size of the estate through the acquisition of more land.

In 1573, Banner ceded Ryegaard to the Crown in exchange for property in Jutland. The Crown later that same year sold Ryegaard to Johanne Oxe. Ryegaard had at some point been granted status of a birk but Frants Banner had unlawfully retained this authority and the estate therefore lost its status of birk in 1586.

It is unclear what happened to Ryegaard after Johanne Oxe's death in 1586 but the estate was most likely ceded to either Johan Barnekow or his widow Anne Pedersdatter Bille since it is known that it was later owned by their daughter Sophie Barnekow. Sophie Barnekow's husband, Eiler Gyldenstiernes, sold the estate to Axel Urne in 1622. Axel Urne's widow, Birgitte Gyldenstierne, sold it in 1640,

The new owner was Niels Trolle. He once again increased the size of the estate through the acquisition of more land. He also restored Ryegaard's status as a birk. After Niels Trolle's death, Ryegaard passed to his son, Holger Trolle, who once again added more land. After Holger Trolle's death, Ryegaard passed to his son and daughter-in-law. Their son, Knud Trolle, sold the estate in 1735.

The new owner was Iver Rosenkrantz. His widow, Charlotte Amalie Skeel, kept the estate after her husband's death in 1745. Their son, Frederik Christian Rosenkrantz, who later served as prime minister, inherited the estate after his mother's death in 1763. He was also the owner of Krabbesholm, Egholm, Barritskov and Trudsholm. He endowed his estates to Niels Rosenkrantz with an obligation to establish a stamhus (family trust) from the estates. Stamhuset Rosenkrantz was established from Ryegaard, Barritskov and Trudsholm while Egholm and Krabbesholm were sold to his brother Marcus Gøye Rosenkrantz.

Niels Rosenkrantz died without children in 1824. Stamhuset Rosenkrantz was therefore passed to his relative Henrik Jørgen Scheel. He was succeeded by his son Frederik Christian Rosenkrantz Scheel. He replaced the old main building with a new one.

After Frederik Christian Rosenkrantz Scheel's death, in 1912, stamhuset Rosenkrantz passed to his son, Henrik Jørgen Scheel, who died in 1917 and was succeeded by Frederik Christian Scheel. The adoption of the lensafløsningslov in 1919 meant that Stamhuset Rosenkrantz was dissolved with effect from 1923. As another consequence of the act, Ryegaard also had to cede 158.1 hectare of land to the government in 1921 and another 29.9 hectares in 1926.

Today
Ryegaard and Trudsholm are today owned by Johan Christian Rosenkrantz Scheel. The two estates have a combined area of 1,228 hectares.

List of owners
 ( -1350) Kronen 
 (1350- ) Folmer Folmersen 
 ( -1387) Jacob Olufsen Lunge 
 (1387-1403) Oluf Jacobsen Lunge 
 (1387-1403) Anders Jacobsen Lunge 
 (1387-1403) Regitze Jacobsdatter Lunge 
 (1387-1412) Folmer Jacobsen Lunge 
 (1412-1421) Sophie Folmersdatter Lunge, gift Serlin 
 (1421-1450) Claus Serlin 
 (1450-1452) Sophie Clausdatter Serlin, gift Arildsen 
 (1452-1493) David Arildsen 
 (1493-1533) Niels Clausen 
 (1533-1554) Erik Eriksen Banner 
 (1554-1573) Frants Banner 
 (1573) The Crown
 (1573-1581) Johanne Oxe 
 (1581- ) Boet efter Johanne Oxe 
 ( - ) Anne Pedersdatter Bille, gift Barnekow 
 ( -1622) Eiler Gyldenstierne 
 (1622-1626) Axel Urne 
 (1626-1640) Birgitte Gyldenstierne, gift Urne 
 (1640-1667) Niels Trolle 
 (1667-1686) Holger Trolle 
 (1686-1709) Christian Trolle 
 (1709-1734) Hilleborg Gyldenstierne, gift Trolle 
 (1734-1735) Knud Trolle 
 (1735-1745) Iver Rosenkrantz 
 (1745-1763) Charlotte Amalie Skeel, gift Rosenkrantz 
 (1763-1802) Frederik Christian Rosenkrantz 
 (1802-1824) Niels Rosenkrantz 
 (1824-1862) Henrik Jørgen Scheel 
 (1862-1912) Frederik Christian Rosenkrantz Scheel 
 (1912-1917) Henrik Jørgen Scheel 
 (1917-1962) Frederik Christian Rosenkrantz Scheel 
 (1962-1998) Niels Henrik Rosenkrantz Scheel 
 (1991- ) Johan Christian Rosenkrantz Scheel

References

Rxternal links
 Official website

Manor houses in Lejre Municipality
Buildings and structures associated with the Lunge family
Buildings and structures associated with the Gyldenstierne family
Buildings and structures in Denmark associated with the Rosenkrantz family
Buildings and structures associated with the Skeel family